Sweat is a 2020 drama film written and directed by Magnus von Horn. It stars Magdalena Kolesnik, Julian Swiezewski, Aleksandra Konieczna and Zbigniew Zamachowski.

Synopsis
Sylvia Zajac, a fitness motivator influencer surrounded by admirers and loyal employees, searches for true intimacy.

Cast

Release
The film was set to have its world premiere at the Cannes Film Festival in May 2020, but the festival was cancelled due to the COVID-19 pandemic. In July 2020, it was announced Gutek Film, TriArt and Mubi had acquired distribution rights to the film in Poland, Sweden and the United States, respectively. Sweat was released in Sweden on 12 March 2021 and in Poland on 18 June 2021.

Reception
The site's critical consensus reads, "Well-acted and appropriately beautiful, Sweat takes a thoughtful, empathetic look at social media fame." The film won the Gold Hugo at the Chicago International Film Festival.

In a review of the film, Giuseppe Sedia wrote for Kino Mania: "While there is no ground to label Sweat as a sophomore slump, von Horn could have gone over the argument that social influencers can have a very complex inner life just like anybody else". He also praised the performance of Zbigniew Zamachowski "who seems to come out straight from an episode of Kieślowski's Dekalog".

References

External links
 

2020 drama films
2020s Polish-language films
Films about social media
Films directed by Magnus von Horn
Films set in Warsaw
Films shot in Warsaw
Polish drama films
Swedish drama films